James Irvin (February 18, 1800 – November 28, 1862) was an American politician.  Irvin was a prominent agriculturalist and ironmaster in Centre County, Pennsylvania.  Irvin represented  in the 27th and 28th Congresses.  Irvin unsuccessfully ran for governor of Pennsylvania in 1847, losing to incumbent governor Francis Rawn Shunk.

Biography
In 1855, the General Assembly of the Commonwealth of Pennsylvania chartered the Farmer's High School. That Farmer's High School is now The Pennsylvania State University. Irvin Hall, one of Penn State's oldest residential halls, named in his honor.

Irvin died in Hecla, Centre County, Pennsylvania, on November 28, 1862. He is buried in Union Cemetery in Bellefonte, Pennsylvania.

The Oak Hall Historic District, associated with his dwelling in College Township, Pennsylvania, was added to the National Register of Historic Places in 1979.  Also on the Register is the Monroe Furnace, which he established in 1847.

References

Bibliography

External links
The Political Graveyard

1800 births
1862 deaths
American ironmasters
Pennsylvania State University people
People from Centre County, Pennsylvania
American agriculturalists
Burials in Pennsylvania
Whig Party members of the United States House of Representatives from Pennsylvania
19th-century American politicians